Tiger Tara (foaled 23 October 2010) is a New Zealand bred Standardbred racehorse that raced at the very top level in both New Zealand and Australia.

He is notable in that he was voted Australian Harness Horse of the Year for the 2019 season and he won seven Group 1 races, including the Inter Dominion Pacing Championship which is raced between the best horses in Australasia.

Racing career

Tiger Tara was originally trained in Canterbury, New Zealand, by Geoff Dunn and driven in all his wins during that time by Gerard O'Reilly.  He was later sold and exported to Australian owners and trained by Kevin Pizzuto and driven by Todd McCarthy.

He won the following major races:
 2019 A G Hunter Cup
 2018 Inter Dominion Pacing Championship.
 2018 Victoria Cup.
 2015 New Zealand Free For All.
 2014 Great Northern Derby.
 2013 New Zealand 3YO Sires final.

He also raced in the New Zealand Trotting Cup and was placed:
 second in 2016 to Lazarus. 
 third in 2017 behind Lazarus and Jack's Legend.
 second in 2018 to Thefixer.

Tiger Tara retired in December 2019 with a record of 112 starts for 37 wins, 40 placings and $2,375,065 in earnings.

Stud career

After retiring from the track, Tiger Tara commenced stud duties at Yirribee Pacing Stud, North Wagga for an initial fee of $3,500.

See also
 Harness racing in New Zealand
 Harness racing in Australia

References

Racehorses bred in New Zealand
Racehorses trained in New Zealand
New Zealand standardbred racehorses
Racehorses trained in Australia
Harness racing in New Zealand
2010 racehorse births
Inter Dominion winners